The Great Ghost Rescue is a 2011 British fantasy horror family film directed by Yann Samuell and starring Emma Fielding and Georgia Groome.  The film is based on Eva Ibbotson's 1975 novel of the same name.

Plot
A family of ghosts from different eras seek out a new home. However, times have changed and they are now threatened by ghost hunters. It is up to a small boy ghost to save his family.

Cast
Jason Isaacs as Narrator (voice)
Emma Fielding as Mabel
Georgia Groome as Winifred
Toby Hall as Humphrey
Otto Farrant as Barnabus
Stephen Churchett as The Head Master
Kevin McKidd as Hamish
Bob Goody as Master Wraith
David Schaal as Builder
Bill Ward as Lord Alfred Seymour
Anthony Head as Prime Minister
Steven Mackintosh as Brad/Barnabus
Ben Forster as Mr. Burnley
Akbar Kurtha as Doctor
Christian Contreras as Antonius
Tracy-Ann Oberman as Mrs. Burnley
Sidney Cole as Wild Eyed Ghost
San Shella as Ghost Remover
Rosemary Leach as The Queen
Ross McCormack as Dan Burnley
Niamh Webb as Carol Burnley
Daren Elliott Holmes as Complaining Father

References

External links
 
 

2011 films
British fantasy films
British horror films
Films based on British novels
Films directed by Yann Samuell
2010s English-language films
2010s British films